Pool B (Kuala Lumpur) of the 2022 Billie Jean King Cup Asia/Oceania Zone Group II was one of four pools in the Asia/Oceania zone of the 2022 Billie Jean King Cup. Five teams competed in a round robin competition, with each team proceeding to their respective sections of the play-offs: the top team played for advancement to Group I in 2023.

Standings 

Standings are determined by: 1. number of wins; 2. number of matches; 3. in two-team ties, head-to-head records; 4. in three-team ties, (a) percentage of matches won (head-to-head records if two teams remain tied), then (b) percentage of sets won (head-to-head records if two teams remain tied), then (c) percentage of games won (head-to-head records if two teams remain tied), then (d) Billie Jean King Cup rankings.

Round-robin

Singapore vs. Malaysia

Thailand vs. Pacific Oceania

Singapore vs. Maldives

Thailand vs. Malaysia

Singapore vs. Thailand

Pacific Oceania vs. Maldives

Singapore vs. Pacific Oceania

Malaysia vs. Maldives

Thailand vs. Maldives

Malaysia vs. Pacific Oceania

References

External links 
 Billie Jean King Cup website

2022 Billie Jean King Cup Asia/Oceania Zone